Heat Wave is the second studio album released by American Motown girl group Martha and the Vandellas. Released in 1963 on Motown's Gordy imprint, intended to capitalize on the success of the title track, which rose to number four on the pop singles chart and number one on the R&B singles chart. The album was produced by Holland–Dozier–Holland (who composed the group's first five hit singles) and William "Mickey" Stevenson. This was the last album to feature original Vandella Annette Beard.

The material is composed almost entirely of cover versions of songs that were popular at the time. These range from pop tunes like "Then He Kissed Me" and "My Boyfriend's Back" to mainstream standards such as "More" (the theme from the 1962 film Mondo Cane) and "Danke Schoen." The folk song "If I Had a Hammer" is also included as the Peter, Paul, and Mary version was big at the time. On its original release, Heat Wave charted lowly at 125 on the U.S. albums chart.

Track listing

Personnel
Martha Reeves – lead vocals
Rosalind Ashford – backing vocals
Annette Beard – backing vocals
Brian Holland and Lamont Dozier – producers
William "Mickey" Stevenson – producer
The Funk Brothers – instrumentation
Joe Hunter – piano on "Heat Wave"
James Jamerson – bass on "Heat Wave"
Richard "Pistol" Allen – drums on "Heat Wave" 
Eddie Willis – guitar on "Heat Wave" 
Robert White – guitar on "Heat Wave" 
Andrew "Mike" Terry – baritone saxophone solo on "Heat Wave"

Singles history
 "Heat Wave" b/w "A Love Like Yours (Don't Come Knocking Everyday)" (#4 US Hot 100),(#1 U.S. Top R&B)

References

External links
 Music.aol.com 

1963 albums
Gordy Records albums
Martha and the Vandellas albums
Albums produced by Brian Holland
Albums produced by Lamont Dozier
Albums produced by William "Mickey" Stevenson
Albums recorded at Hitsville U.S.A.
Albums produced by Edward Holland Jr.